Brian Patrick Wade (born June 9, 1978) is an American actor and physical trainer, best known for his television roles as Capt. Craig Schwetje  in the mini-series Generation Kill, as Kurt (Penny's former love interest) in The Big Bang Theory, and as the Alpha Werewolf Ennis on Teen Wolf.

Career
Wade made his debut in 2002 as an exotic dancer on CSI: Miami. He later appeared in the films Latter Days and The Guardian.

He later appeared on television in episodes of Two and a Half Men, Sabrina, the Teenage Witch, NCIS, Las Vegas, Surface, 'Til Death, The Closer, The Game, and Teen Wolf. He appeared in episodes of Agents of S.H.I.E.L.D. portraying Carl "Crusher" Creel, also known as the Absorbing Man.

Filmography

Film

Television

References

External links
 

1978 births
Living people
American male film actors
American male television actors
American male models
American exercise instructors
21st-century American male actors
Place of birth missing (living people)